Vsevolod Nihaev (born 4 May 1999) is a Moldovan football player. He also holds Russian citizenship as Vsevolod Pavlovich Nikhayev.

Club career
He made his debut in the Russian Football National League for FC Akron Tolyatti on 27 February 2021 in a game against FC Veles Moscow.

References

External links
 

1999 births
Living people
Moldovan footballers
Moldovan expatriate footballers
Association football midfielders
FC Sheriff Tiraspol players
FC Dinamo-Auto Tiraspol players
FC Okzhetpes players
FC Akron Tolyatti players
Moldovan Super Liga players
Kazakhstan Premier League players
Russian First League players
Moldovan expatriate sportspeople in Kazakhstan
Moldovan expatriate sportspeople in Russia
Expatriate footballers in Kazakhstan
Expatriate footballers in Russia